Walter Spencer may refer to:
Walter Baldwin Spencer (1860–1929), British-Australian biologist and anthropologist
Walter Spencer (Canadian football) (born 1978), Canadian football linebacker
Walter Spencer (MP), MP for Barnstaple
Walter G. Spencer (died 1940), medical historian and surgeon

See also
Walter Spencer-Stanhope (disambiguation)